Dahibara Aludum is a variant of Dahi vada and originated from Cuttack of the state Odisha. It is a type of chaat (snack) from Cuttack and is popular throughout India. The dish is prepared by soaking vadas (fried flour balls) in light dahi (yogurt) water which is tempered with mustard seeds and curry leaves. Then adding Aludum (potato curry) and Ghugni (pea curry) to it.

History
It is said that it was first made and sold at Bidanasi (old Cuttack), the vendors who were selling near Barabati Fort. The item for widely spread around Cuttack and whole state of Odisha. The dish is now popular throughout India. It also got an award at National street food Festival held at New Delhi in the year 2020.

Preparation
Washed urad lentils are soaked in normal water overnight and ground into a batter for the vada, then deep fried in hot oil. The deep-fried vadas are first put in water and then again transferred to light yogurt water for soaking for 3–5 hrs. Then the Vadas are added with AluDum (spicy potato curry) and Ghuguni (pea curry). Later chopped onion, cucumber, sprinkles of Indian snacks are added to garnish the dish.

Dahibara AluDum day
1 March of the year is celebrated as Dahibara Aludum Dibos in Odisha.

References

Odia cuisine
Yogurt-based dishes
Indian fast food